Dunderdale Creek is a  long 1st order tributary to Caldwell Creek in Warren County, Pennsylvania. 

It is the only stream in the United States with this name.

Course

Watershed

See also
 List of rivers of Pennsylvania

References

Rivers of Pennsylvania
Rivers of Warren County, Pennsylvania